George Watters may refer to:

George Watters (soldier) (1904–1980), British soldier
George Watters II (born 1949), American sound editor